The 3rd Ring Road is a controlled access urban express road in Zhengzhou, Henan, which runs around the city center.

Route

The 3rd Ring Road runs around Zhengzhou city center in a roughly rectangular shape.

 North 3rd Ring Road: All elevated except the tunnel beneath the Longhu area. All complete.
 West 3rd Ring Road: Partly elevated and partly on-level. All complete.
 South 3rd Ring Road: Partly elevated and partly on-level. All complete.
 East 3rd Ring Road: All elevated except the tunnel beneath Zhengzhou East railway station east plaza. All complete.

Road conditions

Speed limit
The max speed limit is 60 km/h for the tunnel section on the North 3rd Ring Road and 80 km/h for other sections.

Toll
This express road is toll-free.

Lanes
Main road:
 8 lanes (4 lanes for each direction) on East 3rd Ring Road.
 4 lanes (2 lanes for each direction) on the bridge across Zhengzhou North railway station (Beihuan Bridge) on North 3rd Ring Road. (planned to be renovated and widened into 6 lanes)
 6 lanes (3 lanes for each direction) on other sections.

List of exits
In counter-clockwise from northeast:

References

Expressways in Henan
Transport in Henan
Expressways in Zhengzhou